Wymondham College is a coeducational day and boarding school in Morley, near Wymondham, Norfolk, England with academy status. A former grammar school, it is one of 36 state boarding schools in England and the largest of its type in the country, with up to 650 boarding places. It is also an affiliate member of the Headmasters' and Headmistresses' Conference (HMC), although the College has withdraw membership in 2023 under  the direction of the new Principal, focussing on the state school status of the College.

History

Former military hospital
The school is built on the site of the Second World War USAAF 231st Station Hospital, When the school first opened in 1951 the hospital's forty Nissen huts were used as dormitories. It was established by Lincoln Ralphs, the chief education officer of Norfolk County Council. Brick-built accommodation began to appear in the late 1950s, but Nissen huts remained in use, principally for classrooms and storage, through to end of the 1990s. The only Nissen hut now remaining is the College chapel. A memorial garden has been created on the site of the former USAAF mortuary, which for many years was used as the school's technical drawing classroom.

Grammar schools
In 1951 there were two separate schools, Grammar and Technical, each with separate Heads. They merged in the mid-1950s after an uneasy co-existence. The school was a co-educational boarding grammar school. It was intended for academically-gifted children with no grammar schools in their local area that they could attend, as well as those with parents abroad or who regularly moved around the country. It gave priority, where possible, to children from families where the parents had separated, thus possibly under financial hardship. Admissions were by examination and headmasters' reports. 

In the mid-1970s, the school had 700 boarders and 750 day pupils (from the former county grammar school). By 1978 this was 1,000 day pupils as well as the 700 boarders. Margaret Thatcher visited the school in the early 1970s.

The school remained exclusively 'boarding' until the early 1970s, when it was merged with the County Grammar School, which had been hosted at Wymondham on a 'temporary' basis for nearly ten years.

The school in the 1970s had been in a state of disrepair with an out-dated water supply and drainage system, and had an unreliable heating system (built by the USAF in 1944) in the winter and lack of insulation. Despite these problems it was still producing outstanding academic results. It was offered £250,000 in 1978 by the Labour government to address the situation, on condition that the school became a comprehensive school. The money never appeared, partly because soon after Labour lost the 1979 general election.

Comprehensive
Grammar school status was lost with the advent of comprehensive education. In the early 1990s it became a grant maintained school.

The facilities are used for external summer schools. In August 1998, seven children from London on a course run by a special needs charity were taken to the Norfolk and Norwich Hospital after being stung by a swarm of non-native Median wasps. On 9 March 1990, the Duke of Edinburgh visited the school.

Academy
In 2010 the school became an academy as part of the Academies Act 2010. In 2016 the DfE recognised the college as being in the top 100 schools nationally on each of the main three measures, attainment, EBACC pass rate and Value added progress. The college was awarded world class school status in November 2015. In 2016 it was the founding school of a new multi-academy trust, the Sapientia Education Trust. The Trust grew in size to 17 schools by June 2022. The College  won the ‘UK secondary school’ of the year award at the national teaching awards in November 2021.

Wymondham College Prep School 
In 2019, the Sapientia Education Trust announced plans to unveil a new, purpose-built building to house a new preparatory school for children from reception to Year 6, led by Mr Simon Underhill, with a vision to fostering 'development for the whole child'. Despite initial plans to purchase adjacent farmland for the Prep School, the College began construction on the former site of the Cavell Hall lawn, by Morgan Sindall. 

The Prep School has had a varied reception among parents, students, alumni and the wider boarding school community, with some hailing the innovation and convenience it would provide for working parents, while others have questioned the ethics of sending a child away to boarding school at such a young age, although boarding only starts at Year 5. The new building opened in September 2021, together with Underwood Hall the new boarding house. Like Wymondham College, the school is heavily oversubscribed.

House system 
A House system was first established in 1953, with house names North, South, East and West. As the College expanded and brick-built accommodation came into use in the early 1960s, the system was revised and the Houses were given names of cathedral cities:

 Boys: York, Gloucester, Canterbury, Norwich, Durham, Salisbury
 Girls: Wells, Westminster, Worcester, Winchester (with Wakefield and Washington added later)

When mixed Houses were introduced in the early 1970s, the cathedral House names were scrapped and the Houses adopted the names of the Halls themselves. Lincoln and Peel Halls were converted to Sixth Form boarding houses in 1978, Peel Hall being further converted into a boarding house for Year Sevens in 1995.

The house system was as follows:
 Year Seven: Peel
 Years Eight to Eleven: Fry, Cavell, Kett or New
 Years Twelve to Thirteen: Lincoln

As of the 2010–2011 academic year, Peel started to retain some year 7 students in order to become a 'main school house'. Under the new system, the houses appear so:
Years Seven to Eleven: Cavell, Kett, Fry, New or Peel
Years Twelve to Thirteen: Lincoln

Boarding school 
Ofsted inspected the residential accommodation in 2019 and confirmed it remains 'outstanding'.

Archaeology
In January 1958, a hoard of 881 Anglo Saxon (Edward the Elder) coins were found at the school when a drain was being dug.

Notable Old Wymondhamians

 Stephen Byers, Labour MP for North Tyneside from 1992 until 2010, former Chief Secretary to the Treasury, Secretary of State for Trade and Industry, and Secretary of State for Transport, Local Government and the Regions in the Cabinet
 Colin Self, artist (1952–1959)
 Trudy Stevenson, Zimbabwe Ambassador to Senegal (1955–1962)
 Peter Rogers CBE, Chief Executive since 2003 of Babcock International Group plc (1959–1966)
 Patsy Calton Lib Dem for MP for Cheadle from 2001 to 2005 (1960–1967)
 Mark Brayne, BBC foreign correspondent and psychotherapist
 Nicholas Crane, explorer and writer (1965–1972)
 Norman Lamb, Liberal Democrat MP from 2001 for North Norfolk, Minister of State for Care and Support (1969–76)
 Justin Edrich, cricketer (1972–1977)
 Mike Gascoyne, Technical Director of Lotus F1 Racing (1974–1981)
 Mark Strong, actor in Our Friends in the North, and narrator of Who Do You Think You Are (1975-1982)
 Adam Rayner, actor in Mistresses (1998)
 Will Evans, rugby union player for Harlequin F.C. (2019–present)
 George Worth, rugby union player for Leicester Tigers (2016–present)

Wymondham Grammar School
 Sir Frederick William Wilson, Liberal MP from 1895 to 1906 for Mid Norfolk (1855–62)

References

External links 

 Official site

Academies in Norfolk
Boarding schools in Norfolk
Educational institutions established in 1951
South Norfolk
Defunct grammar schools in England
1951 establishments in England
Secondary schools in Norfolk
Wymondham, Norfolk
State funded boarding schools in England